"You Only Live Twice", performed by Nancy Sinatra, is the theme song to the 1967 James Bond film of the same name. The music was by veteran Bond film composer John Barry, with lyrics by Leslie Bricusse. The song is widely recognized for its striking opening bars, featuring a simple 2-bar theme in the high octaves of the violins and lush harmonies from French horns. It is considered by some to be among the best James Bond theme songs, and has become one of Nancy Sinatra's best known hits. Shortly after Barry's production, Sinatra's producer Lee Hazlewood released a more guitar-based single version.

The song has been covered by many artists including Coldplay, Soft Cell, Björk and Shirley Bassey. In 1998, Robbie Williams re-recorded portions of the song (including the opening strings) for use in his UK number-one single "Millennium".

Background

James Bond veteran John Barry returned to the franchise to produce the score. The lyrics were by Leslie Bricusse, who had previously cowritten the lyrics for the theme to Goldfinger.

An initial version of the song was performed by Julie Rogers and recorded with a 50 or 60 piece orchestra at CTS Studios. However, this version was not used since Barry decided to re-write and re-record the song: "It was usually the producers that said 'this isn't working, there's a certain something that it needed'. If that energy wasn't there, if that mysterioso kind of thing wasn't there, then it wasn't going to work for the movie." The Rogers song shares only two lines with the final version, "You only live twice", and "you’ll pay the price". Although there are many similarities in the harmony and orchestration with the final version, it is essentially a different song, with a less lush and more ethnic character.

The film's producer Cubby Broccoli, wanted his friend Frank Sinatra to perform the song. Frank suggested that they use his daughter instead. Barry wanted to use Aretha Franklin, but the producers insisted that he use Nancy instead, who was enjoying great popularity in the wake of her single, "These Boots Are Made for Walkin'".

The final version (2:46) featured in the film's opening title sequence and on the soundtrack LP is in the key of B and has a single vocal track. The song was recorded with a 60 piece orchestra on 2 May 1967 at the CTS Studios in Bayswater, London. Sinatra later recalled that she was incredibly nervous during the recording, and it took around 30 takes to acquire enough material. Producer John Barry eventually created the final version by incorporating vocals from 25 takes.

In UK the soundtrack had been released but while soundtracks such as Doctor Zhivago and Fiddler on the Roof hit the Top 20, You Only Live Twice was less successful. Nancy Sinatra's single version squeezed into the Top 20 for two weeks only. Barry also released an instrumental version but this failed to chart.

In Japan, the soundtrack was released in a gatefold with images from the film and a plot summary.

Critical reception
Roy Wood described Barry's string introduction to his song "You Only Live Twice" as "absolute perfection". Mark Monahan of The Daily Telegraph described the lyrics as "mysterious, romantically carpe diem ... at once velvety, brittle and quite bewitching". David Ehrlich of Rolling Stone ranked "You Only Live Twice" the third best James Bond theme song, calling it "a classic."

Cover versions

The song is one of the most covered Bond themes.
 Nancy Sinatra recorded a different chart version produced by Lee Hazlewood and arranged by session guitarist Billy Strange featuring a guitar backing with Sinatra's voice double tracked as a pun on the word "Twice".
 Little Anthony and the Imperials included a cover of the song on their album Movie Grabbers.
 English synthpop duo Soft Cell included a cover on the B-side of their 1984 single "Soul Inside".
 Australian band the Scientists released a heavy guitar version of the song as a single in 1985.
 Robbie Williams re-recorded portions of the song (including the opening strings) for use in his 1998 single "Millennium". 
 Coldplay released their cover as a B-side on their "Don't Panic" single.
 Shirley Bassey, the vocalist for the title songs from the Bond films Goldfinger, Diamonds Are Forever and Moonraker, performed the song on her 2007 album Get the Party Started.
 Indie-pop group the Postmarks recorded a version for their 2008 album By the Numbers.
 Bill Frisell covered it on his 2016 album When You Wish Upon a Star, an album devoted to covers of songs from films and television. This version is sung by Petra Haden, the daughter of Frisell's frequent collaborator bassist Charlie Haden.
 In 2014, Taiwanese-American singer-songwriter Joanna Wang covered the song on her album Midnight Cinema.
 The duo Beulahbelle (Kaitlyn Dever and Mady Dever) performed a cover of the song on the soundtrack to the 2018 film Tully.
 Mark Lanegan covered the song on his 2013 album Imitations.

In popular culture
The song was used in the closing montage of Mad Men's season five finale, "The Phantom". It was used as entrance music for Japanese professional wrestler Osamu Nishimura in ECW.

Charts

See also
 James Bond music

References

1967 songs
1967 singles
Nancy Sinatra songs
Songs from James Bond films
Soundtrack
Songs with music by John Barry (composer)
Songs written by Leslie Bricusse
Little Anthony and the Imperials songs
Reprise Records singles